Ryan Adrien Bukvich  (born May 13, 1978) is an American former professional baseball relief pitcher. He played in Major League Baseball (MLB) for the Kansas City Royals, Texas Rangers, Chicago White Sox, and Baltimore Orioles.

Career
Bukvich attended the University of Mississippi. Bukvich was called up to the White Sox in June  along with Bret Prinz, replacing the struggling David Aardsma and Mike MacDougal. While Prinz remained with the team for only a matter of days, Bukvich stayed on the roster despite the subsequent return of both Aardsma and MacDougal. Bukvich appeared in 45 games with the White Sox in 2007, going 1–0 with a 5.05 ERA. His win on June 30, 2007, against the Royals was his first since 2003. He became a cult hero at U.S. Cellular Field, earning the nickname "Iceman" for his cool demeanor in pressure situations. Bukvich signed a minor league contract with the Baltimore Orioles on December 7, 2007.

Bukvich spent time during  spring training recovering from an oblique injury. After several days of extended spring training, he joined the Triple-A Norfolk Tides of the International League. He became a free agent at the end of the season. In May 2009, Bukvich signed with the Newark Bears.

References

External links

1978 births
Living people
Kansas City Royals players
Texas Rangers players
Baltimore Orioles players
Chicago White Sox players
Baseball players from Chicago
Major League Baseball pitchers
Ole Miss Rebels baseball players
Sportspeople from Naperville, Illinois
Wilmington Blue Rocks players
Spokane Indians players
Charleston AlleyCats players
Wichita Wranglers players
Omaha Royals players
Arizona League Rangers players
Bakersfield Blaze players
Oklahoma RedHawks players
Charlotte Knights players
Norfolk Tides players
Newark Bears players